Tartu City Museum is a museum in Tartu, Estonia which focuses on the history of Tartu.

The museum was founded in 1955. The museum building was built in the late 18th century.

As of 2015, the museum has about 158,000 items.

The museum permanent exhibition name is "Dorpat. Yuryev. Tartu."

The museum has four branches:
 19th Century Tartu Citizen's Home Museum;
 KGB Cells Museum;
 Oskar Luts Home Museum; 
 Song Festival Museum.

References

External links
 

Museums in Tartu